Princess Maria Isabella of Naples and Sicily (2 December 1793 – 23 April 1801) was a member of the House of Bourbon. She was the youngest child and daughter of Ferdinand I of the Two Sicilies and his wife, Maria Carolina.

Biography
Maria Isabella was born in Naples, and was named after her paternal aunt Maria Isabel Ana, who died at the age of six in 1749. Her father was Ferdinand, Duke of Calabria, the third son and ninth child of King Charles III of Spain and Queen Maria Amalia of Saxony. Her mother was Maria Carolina, Archduchess of Austria, the tenth daughter and thirteenth child of the famous Empress Maria Theresa and her husband, Francis I, Holy Roman Emperor. Through her mother she was a niece of Marie Antoinette, and also through her mother she was a niece of Maria Luisa of Spain and Charles IV of Spain.

Her brothers included the future King Francis and Leopold, Prince of Salerno. Another brother, Carlo, Duke of Calabria, died in 1778 aged 3 of smallpox. Her older sisters included Princess Maria Theresa, namesake of her grandmother, and Princess Luisa, future Grand Duchess of Tuscany. Her older sister Princess Maria Cristina was the wife of the future Charles Felix of Sardinia as Queen of Sardinia. Another sister, Princess Maria Cristina Amelia, died in 1783 of smallpox. Another sister was the Queen of the French as the wife of Louis Philippe I and the youngest was the future Princess of Asturias.

Maria Isabelle died on 23 April 1801, at the age of seven. She was buried at the Church of Santa Chiara in Naples.

Ancestry

References

Bibliography 
 Richard Reifenscheid, Die Habsburger in Lebensbildern, Piper 2006
 John A. Rice, Empress Marie Therese and Music at the Viennese Court, 1792–1807, Cambridge 2003

House of Bourbon-Two Sicilies
House of Habsburg-Lorraine
18th-century Neapolitan people
1793 births
1801 deaths
Neapolitan princesses
Sicilian princesses
Italian Roman Catholics
Burials at the Basilica of Santa Chiara
19th-century Neapolitan people
Royalty and nobility who died as children
Daughters of kings